The 1939 Western Reserve Red Cats football team represented the Western Reserve University, now known as Case Western Reserve University, during the 1939 college football season. The team was led by fifth-year head coach Bill Edwards, assisted by Roy A. "Dugan" Miller.  Home games were played at League Park and Shaw Stadium.

Schedule

References

Western Reserve
Case Western Reserve Spartans football seasons
Western Reserve Red Cats football